Kail is a surname. Notable people with the surname include:

 Edgar Kail (1900–1976), English footballer
 Josh Kail, American politician
 Mary Elizabeth Kail (1828–1890), American poet
 Thomas Kail (born 1978), American theatre director

See also

 Kale (name)
 Kali (name)